José Morganti (nicknamed Cacho), was an Argentine rugby union footballer, who played in the Club Atlético San Isidro and San Isidro Club, winning league titles with both. He also captained the Argentina national team and of Buenos Aires Provincial side.

Career 
Morganti was born in Buenos Aires, beginning his career at Club Atlético San Isidro (mostly known as "CASI"), club where played from 1940 to 1946. In 1947, Morganti moved to CASI's main rival, San Isidro Club, where he played until his retirement in 1951.
 
In 1951, Morganti was called up to join the national team that played the first South American championship that same year. Morganti was captain of the national team that played the final game v. Chile at GEBA stadium, ending with a victory for Argentina by 13–3, therefore crowning champion.

Titles

Club
C.A. San Isidro
 Torneo de la URBA (1): 1943
San Isidro Club
 Torneo de la URBA (1): 1948
Buenos Aires Province
 Campeonato Argentino (1): 1951

National team
 Argentina
 South American Championship (1): 1951

References

External links 
www.sanisidroclub.com.ar

Argentine people of Italian descent
Rugby union players from Buenos Aires
Argentina international rugby union players
Argentine rugby union players
San Isidro Club rugby union players
Club Atlético San Isidro rugby union players
Río de la Plata
Rugby union forwards